The Karama River is a river on the island of Sulawesi, in the province of West Sulawesi, Indonesia, about 1400 km northeast of the capital Jakarta.

Geography
The river flows in the west area of Sulawesi with predominantly tropical rainforest climate (designated as Af in the Köppen-Geiger climate classification). The annual average temperature in the area is 24 °C. The warmest month is September, when the average temperature is around 27 °C, and the coldest is May, at 22 °C. The average annual rainfall is 2863 mm. The wettest month is May, with an average of 367 mm rainfall, and the driest is September, with 108 mm rainfall.

See also
List of rivers of Indonesia
List of rivers of Sulawesi

References

Rivers of West Sulawesi
Rivers of Indonesia